Back from the Edge is the second studio album by British singer and songwriter James Arthur. It was released on 28 October 2016 by Columbia Records. The album reached number one on the UK Albums Chart and was certified platinum—denoting 300,000 sales—the following year, in September 2017. It includes the multi-platinum number-one single "Say You Won't Let Go".

Background
Following his self-titled debut studio album being released on 1 November 2013, peaking to number 2 on the UK Albums Chart, on 5 April 2014, several media outlets began to report that Arthur had been dropped from Syco, following a dispute regarding a song entitled, "Follow the Leader". He took to Twitter to deny the claims, however on 11 June 2014, Arthur announced via Twitter that he and Syco had parted ways by mutual agreement. During the summer of 2014, Arthur stated that he was working on his second album and was close to signing a new record deal. On 6 September 2015, he announced that he had signed with Columbia Records and that a new album was on the way.

Singles
On 9 September 2016, he released "Say You Won't Let Go" as the official lead single from the album. The single peaked at the top of the UK Singles Chart, a position it maintained for three weeks. Outside the United Kingdom, the single has topped the charts in Australia, New Zealand, Sweden, Singapore, Indonesia and the Republic of Ireland. The music video was released in the same month and was directed by Felix Urbauer.

On 10 February 2017, "Safe Inside" was released as the album's second single. The music video was released slightly before on 25 December 2016 and was directed by Frank Hoffman. Arthur performed the song at the 2017 National Television Awards.

Four years later, the album track "Train Wreck" entered the top 20 on the UK Singles Chart after becoming popular in videos on the video app TikTok.

Promotional singles
On 8 January 2016, Arthur released a new song called "The Truth" on iTunes in the United States. Following the song's release, he took to Twitter and clarified that the song would feature on Family Therapy with Dr. Jenn, and that it was not the lead single, only a promotional single. On 21 October, a duet version of "Let Me Love the Lonely" was released as a promotional single only in Poland, featuring Polish singer Marina. The song was certified double Platinum in the country.

Critical reception

Digital Spy gave the album 4 out of 5 stars, labeling it "the anti-X Factor album" and further stating that "This is the winner we all wanted".

Commercial performance
Back from the Edge debuted at number one on the UK Albums Chart, selling 40,906 copies during its first week of release. The album was certified platinum in September 2017 by the British Phonographic Industry, denoting sales of 300,000 in the UK.

Track listing

Charts

Weekly charts

Year-end charts

Certifications

Release history

References

James Arthur albums
2016 albums
Columbia Records albums